Protaleuron herbini is a moth of the  family Sphingidae. It is known from Ecuador.

References

Dilophonotini
Moths described in 2001